State Road 400 (NM 400) is a  state highway in the US state of New Mexico. NM 400's southern terminus is at the end of state maintenance where it continues as County Route 50 in McGaffey, and the northern terminus is at NM 118 and Historic US 66 in Wingate.

Major intersections

See also

References

400
Transportation in McKinley County, New Mexico